Michael Eisenbach (Hebrew: מיכאל אייזנבך), Ph.D., is an Israeli biochemist who specializes in the navigation mechanisms of bacterial and sperm cells. He is a professor emeritus at the Weizmann Institute of Science, Department of Biomolecular Sciences, Rehovot, Israel. He discovered that sperm cells (spermatozoa) of mammals are actively guided to the egg. This opened the research field of mammalian sperm navigation (also termed sperm guidance). He demonstrated that the active navigation entails chemotaxis and thermotaxis. He made seminal contributions to the understanding of these two processes at the molecular, physiological and behavioural levels, as well as contributing to our understanding of the molecular mechanism of bacterial chemotaxis.

Early life 
Eisenbach was born in Tel Aviv, Israel on 10 April 1945. His parents, Menachem (Mendel; 1906–1976) and Haya (Helena Leibler; 1910–1993) Eisenbach, were born in Poland and immigrated to Israel at the end of 1934. Most of their family members remained in Poland and were exterminated in the Holocaust. Michael Eisenbach grew up in Tel Aviv and studied in an evening high school while working during the daytime as a messenger boy (first for the Tel Aviv-Yafo Municipality and then for the Dubek company). He served his compulsory military term in the Israel Defense Forces in 1963–1966.

Education 
Eisenbach attended Tel Aviv University. He received his B.Sc. in chemistry (1969), M.Sc. (with distinction, 1971) and Ph.D. in biochemistry (1975). For his M.Sc., he studied, under the supervision of Chanoch Carmeli, the photosynthetic electron transport chain in chloroplasts. For his Ph.D., he studied, under the supervision of Menachem (Hemi) Gutman, the respiratory electron transport chain in mitochondria. He then moved to the Weizmann Institute of Science for postdoctoral study under the supervision of S. Roy Caplan, where he investigated the proton pump activity of bacteriorhodopsin in the purple membrane of archaea (1975–1978). He did a second postdoctoral fellowship in Madison, Wisconsin, USA where he studied bacterial chemotaxis under the supervision of Julius Adler (1978–1980).

Academic career 
In 1980, Eisenbach returned to the Weizmann Institute as a senior scientist (equivalent to assistant professor) and established his own research group as an independent investigator. Four years later he was promoted to associate professor with tenure, and in 1995 to professor. In 2015, he became a professor emeritus.

Positions held 

 Secretary of the Israel Society for Biochemistry (1989–1990)
 Chairman of the Department of Membrane Research and Biophysics (previously named Department of Membrane Research; currently named Department of Biomolecular Sciences), Weizmann Institute of Science (1989–1995)
 Chairman of the Israel National Committee for Microbiology, the Israel Academy of Sciences and Humanities (1992–2001)
 Director of the Josef Cohn Minerva Center for Biomembrane Research, Weizmann Institute of Science (1994–1999)
 Chairman of the advisory committee of the Aharon Katzir-Katchalsky Center, Weizmann Institute of Science (1996–1999)
 Chairman of the Scientific Council, Weizmann Institute of Science (2000–2002)
 Scientific Coordinator of Conseil Pasteur-Weizmann (2007–2012)
 President of the Israel Society for Biochemistry and Molecular Biology (2008–2011)
 Co-President of Conseil Pasteur-Weizmann (2012–2014)
 President of Conseil Pasteur-Weizmann (2014–2017)

Research

Mammalian sperm navigation 
In the middle of his scientific career, Eisenbach initiated the research field of mammalian sperm navigation. This was in the early 1990s, when the prevailing consensus was that there is no need for sperm navigation in mammals. This idea was based on the very large number of spermatozoa ejaculated into the limited space of the female genital tract. However, the prevailing theory did not take into account that the number of spermatozoa that actually succeed in entering the Fallopian tube is very small. With this background, Eisenbach’s group first found that human spermatozoa accumulate in diluted follicular fluid and that there is a remarkably strong correlation between the ability of follicular fluid from a particular follicle to cause sperm accumulation and the ability of the egg obtained from the same follicle to be fertilized. He then provided the first evidence that this sperm accumulation is the result of chemotaxis, accompanied by chemokinesis, and defined criteria for distinguishing chemotaxis from other processes that might cause sperm accumulation. His group further discovered that only a small fraction of the spermatozoa (~10% in humans) are chemotactically responsive and that the responsive spermatozoa are the capacitated ones (spermatozoa that have reached a maturation stage at which they can penetrate the egg and fertilize it). Whereas the capacitated state had generally been thought of as static, Eisenbach’s group found that the capacitated state is temporary (with a lifespan of 50–240 min for human spermatozoa in vitro), that there is a continuous process of replacement of capacitated spermatozoa within the sperm population, and that cells are phagocytized by macrophages once they lose their capacitation. He hypothesized, and then provided indirect evidence, that the physiological role of this continuous replacement of capacitated spermatozoa in humans is to prolong the availability of these spermatozoa to the egg during the relatively short time window when it resides in the fertilization site. His group then provided the first direct evidence that, subsequent to ovulation (i.e., outside the follicle), both the mature egg and its surrounding cumulus cells secrete chemoattractants and that progesterone is the main chemoattractant secreted from human cumulus cells.

Realizing that chemotaxis is a short-range process, operating over only a few millimetres, Eisenbach looked for a long-range navigation process and discovered thermotaxis. His group found that human, rabbit and mouse spermatozoa can navigate in a temperature gradient by thermotaxis and that, as in chemotaxis, only capacitated cells are thermotactically active. His group further found that, at ovulation, a shallow temperature gradient is established in the rabbit’s oviduct as a result of a temperature drop at the storage site, and that spermatozoa can respond thermotactically to such a shallow gradient. Indeed, his group found that the temperature sensitivity of human spermatozoa is so high that they can respond to a temperature difference of less than 0.0006 °C as they swim a body-length distance. Eisenbach’s group further identified the thermosensors for sperm thermotaxis and found that they are opsins, known to act as photosensors in vision. His group further provided evidence for two signaling pathways in sperm thermotaxis: the cyclic nucleotide pathway, triggered by rhodopsin, and the phospholipase C pathway, triggered by melanopsin and likely by other opsins.

Eisenbach’s group also revealed a major function of the motility type termed hyperactivation (a vigorous motility type, essential for fertilization, with characteristic large amplitudes of head displacement), and showed it to be a part of the behavioral mechanism of both sperm chemotaxis and thermotaxis in humans. Eisenbach further deciphered the behavioral mechanisms of both human sperm chemotaxis and thermotaxis, and showed that both are similar and based on modulation of the frequency of turns and hyperactivation events according to the gradient. He also demonstrated that human spermatozoa detect the chemoattractant concentration gradient in chemotaxis and the temperature gradient in thermotaxis temporally rather than spatially (namely, by comparing consecutive time points rather than comparing different locations).
When Eisenbach realized that only capacitated spermatozoa are capable of active navigation, he proposed that, beyond guiding spermatozoa to the egg at the fertilization site, navigation competence also selects for capacitated spermatozoa, and that, therefore, sperm navigation can be used in artificial reproduction techniques to select capacitated spermatozoa, ripe for fertilization.

In 2004 a startup company, Repromed, was established with the aim of using thermotaxis to increase the success rate of artificial insemination. The company did not succeed, but a few years later, the concept was proven sound when a former postdoc of Eisenbach, Serafín Pérez-Cerezales, succeeded in demonstrating it.

Bacterial chemotaxis 
Eisenbach’s first research area as an independent investigator, and one that he investigated throughout his career, was behavior at the molecular level, employing bacteria (primarily Escherichia coli and Salmonella) as a model system. Bacteria are attracted to some chemicals and repelled from others by chemotaxis. They do it by modulating the direction of flagellar rotation in response to changes in the concentrations of any of these chemicals, sensed by specific receptors. Eisenbach’s research group made fundamental discoveries in bacterial chemotaxis, contributing primarily to the understanding of the molecular mechanism by which the receptors communicate with the flagellar motor and the mechanism by which the motor changes its direction of rotation. His key achievements in this research area are as follows:

 Finding that the motor has a default direction of rotation and that, to initiate rotation in the other direction, a signal molecule — the cytoplasmic protein CheY — has to interact with the switch of the motor.
 Identifying the main binding site of CheY at the switch, the N-terminus of the switch protein FliM, and demonstrating that phosphorylation of CheY increases this binding and, consequently, enhances the rotation in the non-default direction.
 Discovering that the rotation-modulating activity of CheY is regulated not only by phosphorylation but also by acetylation.
 Revealing the molecular mechanism of CheY acetylation as well as the essential function that acetylated CheY fulfills in the motor’s switching mechanism.	
 Uncovering the switching mechanism of the flagellar motor by identifying the processes that occur there subsequent to CheY binding to FliM.
 Discovering that fumarate is a switching factor in E. coli, identifying its target as the enzyme fumarate reductase, demonstrating that fumarate reductase binds to the switch protein FliG and forms a complex with the switch of the flagellar motor, and revealing the molecular mechanism by which fumarate binding to this complex triggers switching to the non-default direction of rotation.

Books 

 Chemotaxis (515 pages) by Eisenbach, M. (2004), published by Imperial College Press, London.
 Sensing and Response in Microorganisms by Eisenbach, M. and Balaban, M. (1985), published by Elsevier Science Publishers, Amsterdam.

Personal life 

Michael Eisenbach married Lea Eisenbach (née Abarbanel) in 1967, divorced in 1985, and married Michal Schwartz (née Hevrony) in 1991. He has three sons: Shmuel ("Mooli", born 1972), Menachem ("Manny", born 1976), and Tomer (born 1993). He had a sister, Chava Teomi (1940–2012).

Hobbies 
Eisenbach started learning to play the clarinet at the age of 70. In 2021, he became a member of the Maskit Clarinet Choir.

References

External links 
  Eisenbach’s website
 

Israeli biochemists
Academic staff of Weizmann Institute of Science
Tel Aviv University alumni
Scientists from Tel Aviv
1945 births
Living people